BookFinder.com is a vertical search website that helps readers buy books online. The site's meta-search engine scans the inventories of over 100,000 booksellers located around the world. Among the books from sellers whose inventories are indexed, users can find the lowest price for a book of their choice from over 150 million volumes available for sale, and purchase titles directly from the bookseller, without a markup. The search engine is focused primarily on Dutch, English, French, German, Italian, and Spanish language titles.

BookFinder.com was founded in 1997 by Anirvan Chatterjee, then a student at the University of California, Berkeley; it was one of the earliest vertical search engines for books online. Originally known as MX BookFinder, it was relaunched as BookFinder.com in 1998 and established as a standalone company based in Berkeley, California in 1999.

In 2005, BookFinder.com was acquired by AbeBooks, which itself was purchased by Amazon.com on August 1, 2008.

BookFinder.com started operating in Europe under the JustBooks brand in 2006. There are currently JustBooks/BookFinder.com portals for France, Germany, the Netherlands, and the UK.

References

Further reading

External links
 

Book websites
Companies based in Berkeley, California
1997 establishments in California
Internet properties established in 1997
Product searching websites
Online marketplaces of the United States